Alan J Gornall (born 1960), is a male retired cyclist who competed for England.

Cycling career
He represented England and competed in the road race and won a gold medal in the road team time trial with Deno Davie, Keith Reynolds and Paul Curran, at the 1986 Commonwealth Games in Edinburgh, Scotland.

He was a professional from 1987-1989.

Personal life
His sister Linda Gornall was also an England international cyclist.

References

1960 births
English male cyclists
Commonwealth Games medallists in cycling
Commonwealth Games gold medallists for England
Cyclists at the 1986 Commonwealth Games
Living people
Medallists at the 1986 Commonwealth Games